Ozyorsky District is the name of several administrative and municipal districts in Russia.

Modern districts

Ozyorsky District, Kaliningrad Oblast, an administrative district of Kaliningrad Oblast

Historical districts

Ozyorsky District, Moscow Oblast, a former administrative and municipal district of Moscow Oblast, which existed until May 2015

See also
Ozyorsky (disambiguation)

References

Notes

Sources

